Ben Robson (born 4 February 1984) is an English actor and model.

Early life
Robson was born and grew up in Newcastle upon Tyne, England. His father worked in manufacturing. He has one younger brother and one younger sister. His sister works as an agent for directors and voice coaches. His brother works in wealth management. His grandmother was born in a Ukrainian orphanage and she moved to Germany during the war.

Robson went to the University of the West of England in Bristol where he studied business.

Career
In August 2015, Ben Robson was cast as 'Craig Cody' in the pilot of Animal Kingdom based on the Australian film of the same name.

In 2016, Robson appeared in the horror film The Boy as 'Cole'. The film also starred Lauren Cohan and Rupert Evans. The film had moderate success but received negative reviews from critics. It grossed $64 million.

In October 2017, Robson was cast in the crime thriller film A Violent Separation as 'Ray'.

Filmography 
 2013: Dracula: The Dark Prince (as 'Lucian')
 2015–2016: Vikings (13 Episodes as 'Kalf')
 2016: The Boy (as 'Cole')
 2016–2022: Animal Kingdom (as 'Craig Cody')
 2019: A Violent Separation (as 'Ray')
 2020: Emperor (as 'Luke McCabe')

References

External links 
 

1984 births
Living people
British actors